Duhaga of Bunyoro was Omukama of Bunyoro (1731-c.1782).  Omukama of Bunyoro is the name given to rulers of the central African kingdom of Bunyoro-Kitara.

Duhaga was preceded by Olimi III - (c. 1710–1731) and later succeeded by Olimi IV - (c. 1782–1786).

References

Bunyoro
Ugandan monarchies
1731 births
1782 deaths